Mielkeana is a genus of moths belonging to the family Tortricidae.

Species
Mielkeana angysocia Razowski & Becker, 1986
Mielkeana gelasima Razowski & Becker, 1983
Mielkeana perbella Razowski, 1993
Mielkeana perjura (Razowski & Becker, 1993)

See also
List of Tortricidae genera

References

 , 2011: Diagnoses and remarks on genera of Tortricidae, 2: Cochylini (Lepidoptera: Tortricidae). Shilap Revista de Lepidopterologia 39 (156): 397–414.
 , 1983, Acta zool. cracov. 26: 439
 ,2005 World Catalogue of Insects, 6

External links
tortricidae.com

Cochylini
Tortricidae genera